Agrotis hispidula is a moth of the family Noctuidae. It is found from the Valparaíso to the Aisén Region in Chile and the Santa Cruz and Mendoza provinces as well as the Bariloche region of Argentina.

The wingspan is 36–40 mm. Adults are on wing in March.

The larvae feed on various herbaceous plants.

External links
 Noctuinae of Chile

Agrotis
Moths of South America
Moths described in 1852